The 2007 Grand Prix of Houston was the third round of the 2007 Champ Car World Series Season, held on April 22 at JAGFlo Speedway at Reliant Park.

Qualifying results

Sébastien Bourdais originally took pole but was penalised for blocking Will Power.  Roberto Moreno substituted for Alex Figge beginning on Saturday after Figge was unable to race the bumpy parking lot circuit with lingering back pain resulting from a crash at Long Beach the previous week.

Grid

Race

Pole sitter Will Power was passed by Sébastien Bourdais and Justin Wilson at the drop of the green flag.  Bourdais short cut a chicane and was forced to drop back into 2nd behind Wilson.  On lap 14 Bourdais regained the lead and built a long lead over Wilson.  The first round of pit stops were done under a yellow caused by debris.  Oriol Servia, substituting again for the injured Paul Tracy, left the pits in 2nd, while Bourdais' teammate Graham Rahal got out in 3rd.  The top three remained static until lap 66 when Oriol Servia's green flag pit stop was balked by his teammate Mario Dominguez, dropping him all the way to 7th.  When Bourdais pitted on lap 68, Tristan Gommendy took the lead by staying out, gambling on a long-shot fuel strategy win.  When Gommendy's race ended at the entrance of pit lane with minutes remaining in the 1 hour, 45 minute timed race (all Champ Car races in the season were held as timed races that ran 1 hour, 45 minutes), Bourdais retook the lead and led the remainder of the race in front of teammate Rahal, who did not provide an undue amount of pressure.  Robert Doornbos solidified his lead in the rookie standings with a 3rd-place finish, while Oriol Servia fought back from the pit stop mishap to a solid 4th-place finish.

Results

Caution flags

Notes

Championship standings after the race

Drivers' Championship standings

 Note: Only the top five positions are included.

Attendance
Race weekend attendance was 168,259 for the Houston edition of the Champ Car World Series in 2007. This represented a 31% increase in attendance over the previous year.

References

External links
 Full Weekend Times & Results
 Champ Car Race Report
 Race Box Score
 Drivers Standings After Race

Houston
Houston Grand Prix
Grand Prix of Houston